The 2021–22 Air Force Falcons men's basketball team represented the United States Air Force Academy during the 2021–22 NCAA Division I men's basketball season. The Falcons, led by head coach Joe Scott in his second-season and sixth overall after coaching at Air Force from 2000 to 2004, played their home games at the Clune Arena on the Air Force Academy's main campus in Colorado Springs, Colorado as members of the Mountain West Conference.

Previous season 
In a season limited due to the ongoing COVID-19 pandemic, the Falcons finished the 2020–21 season 5–20, 5–17 in Mountain West play to finish in 10th place. They lost in the first round of the Mountain West tournament to UNLV.

Offseason

Departures

2021 recruiting class

Roster

Schedule and results 

|-
!colspan=9 style=| Non-conference regular season

|-
!colspan=9 style=| Mountain West regular season

|-
!colspan=9 style=| Mountain West tournament

Source

References 

Air Force
Air Force Falcons men's basketball seasons
Air Force Falcons men's basketball
Air Force Falcons men's basketball